The Magician's Hat (Čarobnjakov šešir) is a 1990 animated film produced by the Croatia Film company and directed by Milan Blažeković. It is the sequel to 1986's The Elm-Chanted Forest.

Story
Thistle the magician teams up with his animal friends, along with some fairies and a volcano-dwelling dragon, to rescue their forest from the wrath of the Ice Emperor Frostkill (Car Mrazomor)  and his army of icy ghost witches.

Release
In late 2007, both this film and its predecessor, The Elm-Chanted Forest, received their DVD debut in the countries of former Yugoslavia from Happy TV. As of 2015, The Magician's Hat has seen no official release in North America.

Cancelled US release
Peter Fernandez was working on an English dub for this film, but it was ultimately cancelled by American Distributors for reasons unknown, yet possibly due to the scene where Emperor Frostkill gets stabbed in the chest by the Sword of Salvation  and thought it was too dark for Western viewers, namely children.

See also
 Cinema of Yugoslavia
 Cinema of Croatia
 Lists of animated feature films

References

External links
 
  Entire film without subtitles on YouTube
  Translations of the main villain's scenes with subtitles also on YouTube

1990 films
Animated films about penguins
1990 animated films
Yugoslav animated films
Croatian animated films
1990s children's fantasy films
Croatian children's films
Animated films based on Slavic mythology
Films set in Yugoslavia